Elio Lo Cascio (born 31 May 1948) is an Italian historian and teacher of Roman history at the Sapienza University of Rome. Lo Cascio's main research interests are the institutional, administrative, social and economic history of Ancient Rome from the Republic to the Late Empire, and Roman population history.

Life 
Lo Cascio was born in Palermo, Sicily, in 1948. He studied Classics at the Sapienza University of Rome (1966–70), where he was a pupil of Santo Mazzarino. From 1973 to 1986, he was assistant professor and then associate professor of Roman History at the Universities of Rome and Lecce. In the years 1976–78, he spent several semesters as a visiting scholar at the University of Cambridge, where Moses I. Finley was Professor of Ancient History at the time. Between 1986 and 1990, he taught as full professor of Roman History at the University of L'Aquila, and from 1990 to 2006 at the University of Naples Federico II.

Lo Cascio is currently Professor of Roman history at the Sapienza University. In 1993 and 2001, he was member of the School of Historical Studies of the Institute for Advanced Study, Princeton, and in 2009 visiting professeur at the École des Hautes Études en Sciences Sociales, Paris.

As of 2010, Lo Cascio is a member of the "Consiglio direttivo" of the "Istituto Italiano per la storia antica"; he is on the scientific committee or the editorial board of several periodicals: the Annali dell'Istituto Italiano di Numismatica, Atene e Roma, Rivista di Filologia e di Istruzione Classica, Rivista di storia economica and Studi storici. He is also the editor of the series Pragmateiai. Collana di studi e testi per la storia economica, sociale e amministrativa del mondo antico, published by Edipuglia.

Recent works 
 Production and Public Powers in Classical Antiquity, Cambridge: Proceedings of the Cambridge Philological Association, Suppl. Vol. 26, 2000 (co-editor), 
 Il princeps e il suo impero. Studi di storia amministrativa e finanziaria romana, Bari: Edipuglia, 2000, 
 Mercati permanenti e mercati periodici nel mondo romano, Bari: Edipuglia, 2000 (editor), 
 Roma imperiale. Una metropoli antica, Roma: Carocci, 2000 (editor), 
 Credito e moneta nel mondo romano, Bari: Edipuglia, 2003 (editor), 
 Cycles and Stability. Italian Population before the Demographic Transition (225 B.C. – A.D. 1900), Rivista di Storia Economica, Vol. 21, No. 3, 2005, pp. 197–232 (co-author), ISSN 
 Innovazione tecnica e progresso economico nel mondo romano, Bari: Edipuglia, 2006 (editor), 
 The Early Roman Empire: The State and the Economy, in Scheidel, Walter; Morris Ian; Saller, Richard (eds.), The Cambridge Economic History of the Greco-Roman World, Cambridge: Cambridge University Press, 2007, pp. 619–647, 
 Forme di aggregazione nel mondo romano, Bari: Edipuglia, 2007 (co-editor), 
 Crescita e declino. Studi di storia dell’economia romana, Roma: L'Erma di Bretschneider, 2009, 
 Agricoltura e scambi nell'Italia tardo-repubblicana, Bari: Edipuglia, 2009 (co-editor), 
 L'impatto della "peste antonina", Bari: Edipuglia, 2012 (editor), 
 Ancient and Pre-modern Economies. GDP in Roman Empire and Early Modern Europe, in de Callataÿ, François (ed.), Quantifying the Greco-Roman Economy and Beyond, Bari: Edipuglia, 2014, pp. 229–51 (co-author),

See also 
 Paolo Malanima

References

External links 
 Personal website at Sapienza University of Rome 

                   

20th-century Italian historians
Italian classical scholars
Academic staff of the Sapienza University of Rome
Sapienza University of Rome alumni
1948 births
Living people
Writers from Palermo
21st-century Italian historians